"Rock Steady" is a single released by American group the Whispers, from their 18th studio album Just Gets Better with Time (1987).  It was produced by the production duo Antonio "L.A." Reid and Kenneth "Babyface" Edmonds.

Chart performance
It was released on June 13, 1987, and to date has been their highest charting single on the U.S. Billboard Hot 100, peaking at number seven in late August, and was their second and final number one on the Hot Black Singles Chart.

Charts

Weekly charts

Year-end charts

Songs influenced by "Rock Steady"
A re-recorded version of the instrumental from this song was used on Kylie Minogue's song "Look My Way" from her debut album Kylie (1988). The actual instrumental from "Rock Steady" was sampled in the truncated version of "Look My Way" that appeared on Minogue's 1993 remix album Kylie's Non-Stop History 50+1.

See also
List of number-one R&B singles of 1987 (U.S.)

References

1987 songs
1987 singles
The Whispers songs
Funk songs
Songs written by Babyface (musician)
Songs written by L.A. Reid
Song recordings produced by Babyface (musician)
Capitol Records singles
SOLAR Records singles
Songs about dancing